Podsędek (literally: sub-judge) was a judicial position in the history of Poland and Grand Duchy of Lithuania. The role and importance of this official varied over time.

In early Poland, it was an official at the prince's house court (sąd dworski, in curiae).

From the 14th century it was a deputy (but not a subordinate) of a land judge. 

His duties included handling the cases which amounted to the "acts of goodwill": sale/purchase contracts, inheritance, power of attorney, marriage/divorce, etc.

References

Polish titles
Legal history of Poland